Sociology is a peer-reviewed academic journal published by SAGE Publications on behalf of the British Sociological Association.

Sociology is the highest impact ranked journal in the UK for the subject area. Sociology is regarded as one of the three "main sociology journals in Britain," along with The Sociological Review and the British Journal of Sociology.

The journal was established in 1967 as "the clearest intellectual representative of the social aspirations of the Butskellite era," with Michael Banton serving as its first editor. It was formerly published by Cambridge University Press and has been published by SAGE Publications since 2002. Shortly after its establishment, it became the official journal of the British Sociological Association, replacing the British Journal of Sociology.

Abstracting and indexing 
Sociology is abstracted and indexed in Scopus and the Social Sciences Citation Index. According to the Journal Citation Reports, its 2019 impact factor is 4.816, ranking it 8 out of 149 journals in the category "Sociology".

Former editors 
 Michael Banton 1967–1970
 John Goldthorpe 1970–1973
 Gordon Horobin 1973-
 Philip Abrams
 Joan Chandler
 David S. Byrne
Martin Albrow 1981–1984
Jennifer Platt 1985–1987
David Morgan 1992–1993
Stephanie Lawlor 2003–2006
 Simin Fadaee 2019–2022
 Helen Holmes 2018–2022

Notable articles 
According to Google Scholar, the most-cited articles published in Sociology are:
John Scott, "Social network analysis", Sociology 1988 vol. 22 no. 1 109-127
John Child, "Organizational Structure, Environment and Performance: The Role of Strategic Choice", Sociology 1972 vol. 6 no. 1 1-22
Sylvia Walby, "Theorising patriarchy", Sociology 1989 vol. 23 no. 2 213-234
Bryan S. Turner, "Outline of a Theory of Citizenship", Sociology 1990 vol. 24 no. 2 189-217
John Goldthorpe, "Women and Class Analysis: In Defence of the Conventional View", Sociology 1983 vol. 17 no. 4 465-488

, the most highly cited article, "Social network analysis" by John Scott, had been cited over 5500 times.

References

External links 
 

Sociology journals
Publications established in 1967
SAGE Publishing academic journals
Bimonthly journals
English-language journals
1967 establishments in the United Kingdom
British Sociological Association
Academic journals associated with learned and professional societies